Metaporana is a genus of plants in the bindweed family Convolvulaceae.

The following species are recognised in the genus Metaporana:

 Metaporana conica Verdc.
 Metaporana densiflora (Hallier f.) N.E.Br.
 Metaporana obtusa (Balf. f.) Staples
 Metaporana parvifolia (K. Afzel.) Verdc.
 Metaporana sericosepala Verdc.
 Metaporana verdcourtii Deroin

References

 
Convolvulaceae genera
Taxonomy articles created by Polbot
Taxa named by N. E. Brown